Erik Willaarts (born 25 August 1961 in Woudenberg) is a Dutch retired footballer.

References

Dutch footballers
Living people
Association football forwards
1961 births
FC Utrecht players
Go Ahead Eagles players
FC Dordrecht players
Borussia Mönchengladbach players